Toro Canyon (Toro, Spanish for "bull") is a census-designated place (CDP) in Santa Barbara County, California, United States. The population was 1,835 at the 2020 census, up from 1,508 at the 2010 census.

Geography
Toro Canyon is bounded on the west by Montecito and Summerland, on the east and southeast by Carpinteria, on the north by Los Padres National Forest, and on the south by the Pacific Ocean.

Demographics

2010
The 2010 United States Census reported that Toro Canyon had a population of 1,508. The racial makeup of Toro Canyon was 1,388 (92.0%) White, 7 (0.5%) African American, 7 (0.5%) Native American, 14 (0.9%) Asian, 1 (0.1%) Pacific Islander, 73 (4.8%) from other races, and 18 (1.2%) from two or more races. Hispanic or Latino of any race were 293 persons (19.4%).

The Census reported that 1,508 people (100% of the population) lived in households, 0 (0%) lived in non-institutionalized group quarters, and 0 (0%) were institutionalized.

There were 620 households, out of which 138 (22.3%) had children under the age of 18 living in them, 352 (56.8%) were opposite-sex married couples living together, 49 (7.9%) had a female householder with no husband present, 15 (2.4%) had a male householder with no wife present.  There were 32 (5.2%) unmarried opposite-sex partnerships, and 8 (1.3%) same-sex married couples or partnerships. 153 households (24.7%) were made up of individuals, and 71 (11.5%) had someone living alone who was 65 years of age or older. The average household size was 2.43.  There were 416 families (67.1% of all households); the average family size was 2.87.

The population was spread out, with 253 people (16.8%) under the age of 18, 107 people (7.1%) aged 18 to 24, 290 people (19.2%) aged 25 to 44, 525 people (34.8%) aged 45 to 64, and 333 people (22.1%) who were 65 years of age or older.  The median age was 50.2 years. For every 100 females, there were 91.1 males.  For every 100 females age 18 and over, there were 93.1 males.

The homeowner vacancy rate was 1.6%; the rental vacancy rate was 6.6%.  1,088 people (72.1% of the population) lived in owner-occupied housing units and 420 people (27.9%) lived in rental housing units.

2000
As of the census of 2000, there were 1,697 people, 698 households, and 450 families residing in the CDP. The racial makeup of the CDP was 87.98% White, 0.35% African American, 0.35% Native American, 1.36% Asian, 0.18% Pacific Islander, 8.01% from other races, and 1.77% from two or more races. Hispanic or Latino of any race were 16.26% of the population.

There were 698 households, out of which 22.8% had children under the age of 18 living with them, 54.2% were married couples living together, 7.3% had a female householder with no husband present, and 35.4% were non-families. 27.9% of all households were made up of individuals, and 9.5% had someone living alone who was 65 years of age or older.  The average household size was 2.43 and the average family size was 2.91.

In the CDP, the population was spread out, with 20.2% under the age of 18, 5.7% from 18 to 24, 25.0% from 25 to 44, 31.8% from 45 to 64, and 17.4% who were 65 years of age or older.  The median age was 44 years. For every 100 females, there were 98.5 males.  For every 100 females age 18 and over, there were 95.5 males.

The median income for a household in the CDP was $68,789, and the median income for a family was $79,732. Males had a median income of $58,207 versus $32,969 for females. The per capita income for the CDP was $45,967.  About 4.6% of families and 7.4% of the population were below the poverty line, including 1.5% of those under age 18 and 3.3% of those age 65 or over.

References

Census-designated places in Santa Barbara County, California
Census-designated places in California
Populated coastal places in California